The Tasmanian Devil was the name of a drag racing car in the 1960s, named after the Tasmanian Devil cartoon character.

During the same time period that The Tasmanian Devil cartoon character was making a name for itself, a mechanical incarnate of this cartoon character was growing in popularity on the drag racing scene. Drag racing was in its early days and the cars and popular racing teams were always known by nicknames. Don Garlits had "The Swamp Rat" and Pacers Automotive had "The Tasmanian Devil". The Snizek & Dodge Racing Team at Pacers Auto created a powerful mean machine worthy of its nickname.

The Tasmanian Devil in racecar form was always loud, snarling all the way to the starting line and then unleashing a deafening roar as it raced down the track leaving behind a long hazy smoke trail. Crowds loved it as it devoured anything in its way - both race cars and speed records. Driver, George Snizek and his partner Charlie Dodge (1931-2002) were perennial finalists in NHRA sanctioned events and set numerous track, class, and NHRA speed records while becoming a true force in the 1960s drag racing scene. Aside from being the East Coast distributors of Nitromethane Racing Fuel, the team from Pacers were known as innovators in their field-being credited as the first to use silicone as an engine sealant and being the first car in its class to necessitate use of a parachute to stop "The Devil" in a class other than dragsters. Charlie Dodge & George Snizek joined forces with Murray Gellman of Sydmur Electronic Specialties to design and sell a competition-designed ignition system known as "The Thing".

Pacers Auto was one of the first racing teams to incorporate appearance and ability having color co-ordinated racecars and matching racing team uniforms. They were one of the first raceteams to utilize a team-coordinated tow trailer as well. They were members of Hi-Performance "Cars Magazine" Racing Team and were featured in Walter Ungerer's 1965 film called "The Tasmanian Devil" which documented the AA/A roadster and the crew that built it to become the number one racecar in its class. It was filmed on location at Island Dragway, New Jersey one week after it set the NHRA AA/A Class Speed record in Atco Raceway in New Jersey. According to Martyn Schorr, the former editor of CARS Magazine, the Snizek & Dodge Racing Team amassed over 150 event wins together on the East Coast dragstips.  

After a long absence, a resurrection of The Tasmanian Devil NHRA AA/A Roadster is being sponsored by AAA Firefighting Equipment's Jerry Joaquin, with guidance from original driver, George Snizek, to once again light up the tracks and race once again. Chassis, Body, Paintwork and final engine assembly are being handled by Southwest Custom Trucks in Apache Junction, Arizona, while the custom enginework is being performed by Greulich's Engine Machining in Phoenix, Arizona.

External links 
 The Tasmanian Devil Roadster
 The Tasmanian Devil Roadster in Hot Rod Magazine July 1965
 George Snizek
 Charlie Dodge
 NHRA AA/ Altered Class Record 1963

About

The Pacers from Pacers Automotive out of Oceanside, NY aka " The Snizek & Dodge Racing Team" were a popular and record-setting team on the early drag racing scene in the 1950s and 1960s. - George Snizek, driver, and Charlie Dodge (1931-2002), head wrench, always delighted fans with tire-smoking performances from their Chrysler hemi-powered 23T Altered Roadster, which set numerous track, class and speed records across the AA/A, CC/FD, & A/FD classes and was appropriately nicknamed, The Tasmanian Devil.

The team was also a founding member of the CARS Magazine Racing Team and Official Road Test Consultants for that publication. They were the East Coast distributors of Nitromethane Racing Fuel.

Record, honors, awards, and stats

NHRA CLASS Record AA/Altered 154.90MPH. June 16, 1963,  Atco, NJ.
Best Appearing Car & Crew, 1963 NHRA Nationals Indianapolis, IN.
NHRA CLASS Record AA/Altered 161.87 MPH @ 9.56 SEC. 1964 NHRA Nationals, Indianapolis, IN.
NHRA CLASS Record AA/Altered 162.45 MPH @ 9.51 SEC. 1964 NHRA Nationals, Indianapolis, IN.
'Best Appearing Car of Meet NHRA 1st Regional Meet of 1965. 8.81SEC A/FD Class. Cecil County, MD NHRA CLASS Record CC/FD 165.13 MPH @ 9.34SEC'. Island Dragway May 22, 1966.

Reference articlesCars Magazine, October 1964, "Cars Goes Dragging", cover and pp.30–33.Cars Magazine, June 1965, "Setting up a CM/SP Sting Ray".Cars Magazine, July 1966, "Build A C/Stock Record Breaker", cover, pp.18-22 and 75.Cars Magazine, July 1966, "Cars Fueler goes 7.65", cover and p.3.Cars Magazine, June 1966, "CARS Builds a Fueler- Part III Body Construction", pp.36–40.Drag Racing Magazine, January 1965, "Five Big Days", pp.21 and 65.Hot Rod Magazine, November 1963, "Best Appearing Crew Award, Pacers Auto Car Club", pp.30–31.Hot Rod Magazine, November 1964, "National Record Chart" pp.79-80.Hot Rod Magazine, December 1964, "Fast'n'Fancy" by Dick Wells.Hot Rod Magazine, July 1965, "Tasmanian Devil, pp.48–49.Hot Rod Magazine, August 1991, rear cover.
McClurg, Bob. Diggers, Funnies, Gassers & Altereds: Drag Racing's Golden Era. p.52.Rod Action Magazine, September 1975, "The East Remembered", p.9.Rodder and Super Stock Magazine, March 1965, "Bella Rita I", cover and pp.29–32.Rodder & Super Stock Magazine, March 1965, "Comet Cyclone".Rodders Manual, July 1962, coverScience & Mechanics Magazine'', May 1964, "Ten Hottest Hot Rods", cover and pp.44–45.

Drag racing cars